Waterford is a village in the East Hertfordshire district of Hertfordshire, England. It is located on the A119 road, around 2.5 km (1.6 miles) north of Hertford. The River Beane flows through the village. It is in the civil parish of Stapleford.

Waterford is most notable for the church of St Michael and All Angels, built by Robert and Isabel Smith in 1871/2, which has Pre-Raphaelite stained-glass windows from the Morris & Co. factory. They date from the church's original construction through to 1937 and include Miriam by Edward Burne-Jones.

St Michael and All Angels is an excellent example of Victorian construction in the Early English Gothic style. It was financed by Robert Smith, owner of the Goldings estate close to the church. All wood used in constructing the church came from the Estate. The roof is lined with Broseley tiles and the bell tower and octagonal spire with cedar shingles. The porch is of oak construction.

There are 14 stained-glass windows; eight by Burne-Jones, and others by William Morris, Douglas Strachan, Ford Madox Brown, Karl Parsons and Selwyn Image. Tracery above the three west windows was done by Philip Webb.

Goldings is a Grade II* listed country house which was used as a Dr. Barnardo's Home between 1922 and 1967 and has now been converted to apartments. Several Barnardo's children are buried in St Michael's churchyard, which also contains graves of the Abel Smith family including Robert and Isabel Smith.

References

External links

Villages in Hertfordshire
Stained glass